William Austin Dewell (January 2, 1917 – January 19, 2000) was an American football player. He played professionally with the Chicago Cardinals of the National Football League (NFL). He served in World War II for the United States Navy before rejoining the Cardinals in 1945.

References

External links
 

1917 births
2000 deaths
American football ends
Chicago Cardinals players
Corpus Christi Naval Air Station Comets football players
SMU Mustangs football players
People from Concordia, Kansas
Players of American football from Kansas
United States Navy personnel of World War II